Round Midnight is a 1975 live album by Betty Carter. It was recorded at the same 1969 concert as her album Finally, Betty Carter. It is not to be confused with Carter's similarly titled 1963 studio album, 'Round Midnight.

Track listing
 "Do Something" (Bud Green, Sam H. Stept) – 2:52
"Ev'ry Time We Say Goodbye" (Cole Porter)  – 5:45
"My Shining Hour" (Harold Arlen, Johnny Mercer) – 2:35
"Something Wonderful" (Richard Rodgers, Oscar Hammerstein II) – 6:31
"What's New?" (Bob Haggart, Johnny Burke) – 2:38
"By the Bend of the River" (Clara Edwards, Bernhard Haig) – 1:36
"I'm Pulling Through" (Arthur Herzog Jr., Irene Wilson) – 4:28
"'Round Midnight" (Bernie Hanighen, Thelonious Monk, Cootie Williams) – 5:45
"The Surrey with the Fringe on Top" (Rodgers, Hammerstein) – 8:25

Personnel

Recorded December 6, 1969 at Judson Hall, New York City, New York, USA:

 Betty Carter - vocals
 Norman Simmons - piano
 Lisle Atkinson - bass
 Al Harewood - drums

Betty Carter live albums
1975 live albums
Roulette Records live albums